Aaptos glutinans is a species of sea sponge belonging to the family Suberitidae. The species was described in 2011. It was found in the localities known as Fernando de Noronha and Atoll das Rocas (Piscina das Âncoras, Rocas Atoll) Rio Grande do Norte, Brazil.

References

Aaptos
Animals described in 2011